Prince Friedrich Karl of Prussia (Tassilo Wilhelm Humbert Leopold Friedrich Karl; 6 April 1893 – 6 April 1917) was a German prince and competitive horse rider who competed in the 1912 Summer Olympics.

Biography
Prince Friedrich Karl was born in Schloss Klein-Glienicke, Potsdam, Berlin.  He was the son of Prince Friedrich Leopold of Prussia (1865–1931) and Princess Louise Sophie of Schleswig-Holstein-Sonderburg-Augustenburg (1866–1952) and a grandson of Prince Frederick Charles of Prussia.

He was a member of the 1912 German Olympic equestrian team, which won a bronze medal in the team jumping event.  His horse during the Olympic competition was "Gibson Boy".

He fought in World War I as an aviator between 1914 and 1917.  He commanded Fliegerabteilung (Artillerie) 258, an artillery spotting unit, but flew patrols in a single-seat fighter with Jasta Boelcke whenever possible.  During one such patrol on March 21, 1917, he was forced to land because of a bullet in his engine and with a slight wound to his foot.  He landed his Albatros aircraft in no-man's land, but while running towards his own lines he was shot in the back and severely wounded by Australian troops. He was taken into captivity, where he died from his injuries on 6 April 1917 (his 24th birthday) at Saint-Étienne-du-Rouvray.

Regimental Commissions
  1. Garderegiment zu Fuß (1st Regiment of Foot Guards), Leutnant à la suite from 1903; Leutnant by 1908.
  Fliegerabteilung (Artillerie) 258 (artillery aerial observer squadron), squadron commander, 1917.

Chivalric Orders
  Knight, Order of the Black Eagle, 1903
  Knight Grand Cross (with Crown), Order of the Red Eagle, 1903
  Knight, First Class, Prussian Crown Order, 1903
  Knight Grand Commander, Royal House Order of Hohenzollern, ca 1903

Military Decorations (1914-1917)
  Iron Cross, Second Class
  Iron Cross, First Class
  Flugzeugführerabzeichen (Pilot's qualification badge), ca. 1917

Ancestry

See also
 List of Olympians killed in World War I

References

External links

See for photograph of Prince Karl and airplane
Information about Fliegerabteilung 258 & von Preußen

1893 births
1917 deaths
Prussian princes
German male equestrians
German show jumping riders
Equestrians at the 1912 Summer Olympics
Olympic equestrians of Germany
Olympic bronze medalists for Germany
German military personnel killed in World War I
House of Hohenzollern
Military personnel from Potsdam
Olympic medalists in equestrian
Royal Olympic medalists
Prussian Army personnel
Luftstreitkräfte personnel
Shot-down aviators
Medalists at the 1912 Summer Olympics
German prisoners of war in World War I
Deaths by firearm in France